15 Minutes is the twenty-eighth studio album by American singer-songwriter Barry Manilow. It was released on June 14, 2011, by Stiletto Entertainment

Background
The album was the first independent release of Manilow's career, through his Stiletto Entertainment label (distributed by Fontana/Universal Music). In interviews around the time of the release, Manilow said that his long-time friend and mentor, Clive Davis, had told him that he could not sell an album of Manilow performing any new Manilow songs now, given the string of great albums covering other artists' songs Manilow released in the 1990s and 2000s. But Manilow thought he could still be relevant as a songwriter too. This led to his second departure from Arista and the decision to go independent.

The majority of the songs were co-written with longtime lyricist Enoch Anderson, with one song, "Wine Song," co-written with another longtime lyricist, Adrienne Anderson.

Critical reception

AllMusic's Stephen Thomas Erlewine wrote that Manilow "not only rides a tightly wound drum loop on "Work the Room", but he also raps, a development nearly as disconcerting as the cuss he slips into its chorus." 15 Minutes offers something "unexpected", he added. At the end of his review, Erlewine noted that Manilow is "trying hard to deliver serious, sharply crafted pop, and even if the album doesn't entirely work, it's hard not to give him considerable credit for his ambition."

Awards
15 Minutes won Manilow a Best Traditional Pop Vocal Album Grammy Award nomination in 2012.

Commercial performance
The album debuted on the Billboard 200 album chart at its peak position of number 7, his first studio album of mostly original songs to crack the Top 10 since 1979's One Voice.  

It also debuted on the UK Albums Chart at its peak of number 20. In Canada, the album reached number 36 on the Canadian Albums Chart.

Track listing

Charts

References

2011 albums
Barry Manilow albums
Rock operas
Concept albums